Marghe and Her Mother is a 2019 British-Italian-Iranian drama film written and directed by Mohsen Makhmalbaf. Starring Ylenia Galtieri,Margherita Pantaleo and Raffaella Gallo.

Plot 
In Italy, Claudia is a young single mother who lives with her daughter named Marghe, an six-year-old precocious girl. When Claudia is kicked out of her home for not being able to pay the rent, she leaves Marghe to an neighbour, while she goes to search for new opportunities of employment and love.

Cast
 Ylenia Galtieri as Claudia
 Margherita Pantaleo as Marghe
 Paolo C. Santeramo as Alessandro
 Raffaella Gallo as Giulia
 Danilo Acinapura as Alberto

Release
The film had its premiere at 24th Busan International Film Festival in October 2019, as "Icon" at the festival. It is also selected as closing film of the 50th International Film Festival of India to be screened on 2019.

Reception

Accolades

References

External links
 
 

2019 films
2019 drama films
Films directed by Mohsen Makhmalbaf
Iranian drama films
Italian drama films
2010s Italian films